Cristoforo di Messisbugo or Cristoforo da Messisbugo (15th century – 1548) was a steward of the House of Este in Ferrara and an Italian cook of the Renaissance.

Biography

From 1524 to 1548, di Messisbugo served at the courts of Alfonso I and his son, Ercole II, in Ferrara, where he organized many lavish banquets. Greatly appreciated as a master of ceremonies, he was made count palatine on 20 January 1533 by the Holy Roman Emperor Charles V.

His cookbook Banchetti, composizioni di vivande e apparecchio generale, which was published posthumously in 1549, is addressed to those preparing princely feasts and provides detailed descriptions of the menus for his official banquets at the Este court. As well as listing recipes, it also discusses logistics, decor, and cooking equipment. Libro novo nel qual si insegna a far d'ogni sorte di vivanda, attributed to him and published in Venice in 1564, well after his death, is largely a repetition of his recipes in Banchetti. Some of the dishes he described survive today in the Ferrara area.

The first known reference to the preparation of Beluga sturgeon caviar (from the Po River) in Italy is in Messisbugo's books. He described serving and preserving caviar.

He is buried in the church of the monastery of Sant'Antonio in Polesine.

Bibliography
Cristoforo da Messisbugo, Banchetti, composizioni di vivande e apparecchio generale, Ferrara, 1549 full text
Cristoforo da Messisbugo, Libro novo nel qual si insegna a far d'ogni sorte di vivanda, Venezia, 1564 full text

See also
Bartolomeo Scappi

References

Sources
 Alberto Capatti, Massimo Montanari, Italian Cuisine: A Cultural History, 2003.

External links
Photos de la Bibliothèque Casanatense
Banchetti, composizioni di vivande e apparecchio generale
Libro novo nel qual si insegna a far d'ogni sorte di vivanda
Gastrocheanolites messisbugi a Lower Jurassic icnospecies dedicated to Messisbugo occurs in the rock columns in the Main Post Office of Ferrara

1548 deaths
Italian chefs
Italian Renaissance people
16th-century Italian writers
Imperial counts palatine
Italian food writers
Italian cookbook writers
15th-century births
Ferrara
Italian gastronomes